Iris Vandeleur (1884–1969) was a British stage and film actress. In 1951 she appeared in the BBC television series Sherlock Holmes as Mrs. Hudson, the landlady.

In the West End she appeared in 1939 in Ian Hay's comedy Little Ladyship.

Filmography

References

External links 
 

1884 births
1969 deaths
People from Stirling
British film actresses
British stage actresses
British television actresses